is a passenger railway station in located in the city of  Fukuchiyama, Kyoto Prefecture, Japan, operated by the private railway company Willer Trains (Kyoto Tango Railway).

Lines

Station layout
The station consists of one side platform serving a single bi-directional track. The station is unattended. There is no station building except for a shelter on the platform. Next to the Miyafuku Line track, a track of the Sanin Main Line exists with no platform.

Adjacent stations

History

Passenger statistics
In fiscal 2018, the station was used by an average of 39 passengers daily.

Surrounding area
Municipal Fukuchiyama Municipal Hospital
Fukuchiyama Municipal Seiwa Junior High School

See also
List of railway stations in Japan

References

External links

Official home page 

Railway stations in Kyoto Prefecture
Railway stations in Japan opened in 1988
Fukuchiyama, Kyoto